Roberto Sinibaldi (born 2 August 1973) is an Italian former yacht racer who competed in the 1996 Summer Olympics. He was born in Orbetello, Grosseto, Italy.

References

External links
 
 
 

1973 births
Living people
Italian male sailors (sport)
Olympic sailors of Italy
Sailors at the 1996 Summer Olympics – Star
Star class world champions
World champions in sailing for Italy